The Lion, the Witch and the Wardrobe is an animated television program that was broadcast in two parts on CBS on April 1 and 2, 1979, based on the 1950 novel The Lion, the Witch and the Wardrobe by C. S. Lewis.

Plot
When four orphaned children Lucy, Susan, Edmund and Peter stumble into an old Wardrobe they find themselves in a magical land called Narnia with talking animals, fauns, hags, the Wicked White Witch and the great lion Aslan. There they meet the friendly Mr. and Mrs. Beaver, who help them on their quest to find Aslan the great lion. Only he can help save Lucy's friend Mr. Tumnus (the faun) from the White Witch. They have a fun mysterious time there, and ultimately end up ruling as kings and queens, until they end up back home. The Professor tells the children that they will return to Narnia one day.

Production notes
The rights to produce the television program were given to the Episcopal Radio TV Foundation in the mid-1950s when C.S. Lewis was recording the Episcopal Series of the Protestant Hour radio programs. Dr. Ted Baehr was elected President of the Episcopal Radio TV Foundation as The Lion, the Witch and the Wardrobe was preparing to be broadcast by CBS, and he supervised the distribution of the subsequent video. The CBS program had 37 million viewers and won two Emmy Awards.

Voices

UK version
 Lisa Moss as Lucy
 Nicholas Barnes as Edmund
 Stephen Garlick as Peter
 Shelley Crowhurst as Susan
 Sheila Hancock as Jadis - The White Witch
 Arthur Lowe as Mr. Beaver
 Leo McKern as Professor
 Leslie Phillips as Mr. Tumnus
 June Whitfield as Mrs. Beaver
 Stephen Thorne as Aslan

US version
 Rachel Warren as Lucy
 Susan Sokol as Susan
 Reg Williams as Peter
 Simon Adams as Edmund
 Victor Spinetti as Mr. Tumnus
 Dick Vosburgh as Professor
 Don Parker as Mr. Beaver
 Liz Proud as Mrs. Beaver
 Beth Porter as Jadis, The White Witch
 Stephen Thorne as Aslan

The only actor to appear in both versions was Stephen Thorne (who voiced Aslan).

Differences between novel and animated film

The meeting with Father Christmas, as well as the season's arrival, is omitted (though he is mentioned by some Talking Animals). Instead, Aslan gives the children their weapons.
There is a point in which eventually all four of the children enter the wardrobe (albeit two are still skeptical of Narnia). In the novel, this is in order to escape a housekeeper whom they do not like, but in the cartoon there is no specified reason.
The novel, and other adaptations, clearly portray the children as evacuees staying at the home of the Professor during World War II. In this cartoon, no particular reason is stated for them staying there.
No mention is made of World War II, and the clothing style of the children suggests a present-day setting.
Rather than ask Edmund what he would most like to eat (whereupon he chooses Turkish delight), as in the novel, The Witch simply offers him Turkish delight directly.
The wolf Captain of the White Witch's Secret Police is named "Fenris Ulf" (like in early American editions of the book) instead of "Maugrim".
 Mrs. Macready, the Professor's housekeeper, was dropped from the film, and instead of the children being chased into the Wardrobe in the spare room, they all decided to try to get to Narnia all together after the Professor had discussed the truth about it with Peter and Susan.
The White Witch's dwarf was last seen before the battle and it is unknown what happened to him after the battle.
In the cartoon, the Minotaurs are on Aslan's side. In the novel, the Minotaurs work for the White Witch.

Releases
 Released on VHS in 1985 and 1991 and 1998.
 Released on DVD on Region 1 and 2 in 2006.

VHS UK history 
Children's Video Library (1985)

References

External links
 

1970s American television miniseries
1979 television films
1979 films
TV 1979 
Television shows directed by Bill Melendez
American television films
Fantasy television films
1970s children's animated films
Films based on fantasy novels